Aj Zombies! (also known: Aj Zombies! La película) is a 2017 Peruvian adventure horror comedy film directed by Daniel Martín Rodríguez, financed by StudioCanal. The film is based on the web series of the same name, starring Emilram Cossío and Anahí de Cárdenas.

Synopsis 
While the world is becoming extinct due to a zombie infestation that began in Peru, Claudia and Felipe will understand that their love is possible... as long as a drunkard and a guachimán accompany them in their struggle to survive. This is the craziest love story that a zombie apocalypse in Peru could generate.

Cast 

 Emilram Cossío as Felipe
 Anahí de Cárdenas as Claudia

 César Ritter as Arias

 Miguel Iza as The drunk
 Liliana Trujillo as Santitos

 Pietro Sibille as Collector
 Alicia Mercado as Daughter Road
 Julián Legaspi as Journalist

Release 
Aj Zombies! had its international premiere in October 2017 at Morbido Fest 2017. Subsequently, the trailer for the film was released on YouTube, quickly reaching 3 million views, and then premiered on October 10, 2019 in Peruvian cinemas.

References

External links 

 

2017 films
2017 comedy horror films
Peruvian comedy horror films
Peruvian adventure films
2010s Spanish-language films
2010s Peruvian films
Films set in Peru
Films shot in Peru
Films about zombies
Films about alcoholic drinks
Films about social class
StudioCanal films
Films based on web series